Town Challenge Cup is a rowing event for women's coxless fours at the annual Henley Royal Regatta on the River Thames at Henley-on-Thames in England.

The event is open to members of any club established at least one year before the closing date for entries. It was inaugurated in 2017 and is not to be confused with the former men's event of the same name that ran from 1839 until 1883.

Winners

References

Events at Henley Royal Regatta
Rowing trophies and awards